Bellevigne-en-Layon is a commune in the Maine-et-Loire department of western France. The municipality was established on 1 January 2016 and consists of the former communes of Thouarcé, Champ-sur-Layon, Faveraye-Mâchelles, Faye-d'Anjou and Rablay-sur-Layon.

Population
The population data given in the table below refer to the commune in its geography as of January 2020.

References

See also 
Communes of the Maine-et-Loire department

Communes of Maine-et-Loire
States and territories established in 2016